CS Meaux Handibasket is the wheelchair basketball major sports club in France, with five European titles and eighteen domestic titles.

History

Home arenas
 Gymnase Fontaine
 Complexe Sportif Tauziet (Halle des Sports Christian Rousel)

Honors

Domestic competitions
Titles won in French championships:

 French Wheelchair Basketball Nationale 1A:
 Winners (18): 1980–81, 1992–93, 1993–94, 1994–95, 1995–96, 1996–97, 1997–98, 1998–99, 1999–2000, 2000–01, 2004–05, 2007–08, 2009–10, 2010–11, 2011–12, 2012–13, 2014–15, 2016–17
 Finalists (7): 2001–02, 2002–03, 2003–04; 2005–06; 2008–09; 2013–14; 2015–16
 French Wheelchair Basketball Nationale 1B (second division):
 Winners: 1986–87
 French Wheelchair Basketball Nationale 1C (third division):
 Winners: 2013–14 (by the second team)
 French Wheelchair Basketball Cup:
 Winners (13): 1992–93, 1993–94, 1994–95, 1995–96, 1996–97, 1997–98, 1998–99, 1999–2000, 2000–01, 2008–09, 2009–10, 2010–11, 2011–12
 Finalists: 2002–03, 2004–05, 2007–08, 2012–13, 2014–15

International competitions
Titles won in European championships:

 IWBF Champions Cup:
 Winners (3): 1998–99, 1999–2000, 2000–01
 Finalists (2): 1993–94, 1994–95
 Third place (3): 1995–96, 1996–97, 1997–98
 André Vergauwen Cup:
 Winners (1): 2009–10
 Finalists (2): 1980–81 (named MTI Meaux), 1992–93
 Third place (3): 1990–91, 2014–15, 2015–16
 Willi Brinkmann Cup:
 Winners (1): 2010–11

Head coaches

References

External links
 

Wheelchair basketball teams
Basketball teams established in 1970
Basketball teams in France
1970 establishments in France